Lotec is a German sports car manufacturer. The company was founded in 1962 by Kurt Lotterschmid. By 1969, the firm began building race cars, and would turn their attention to modifications for Porsches in 1975. In 1983, they began to create aftermarket aerodynamic and performance parts for Mercedes-Benz cars and Ferrari cars.

In 1990, Lotec was commissioned by an oil baron from the United Arab Emirates to build a sports car for him. The vehicle (known as the Lotec C1000) was completed in 1995, at a final price of around $3.4 million (USD). The car is equipped with a 5.6L Mercedes-Benz V8. The engine was fitted with two turbochargers for a total output of 1000 hp.

In the year 2004, the company completed its first production vehicle, badged the Sirius. The Sirius is powered by the same 5987cc Mercedes-Benz V12 as the Pagani Zonda. Lotec claims that the car will produce 1000 hp, or up to 1200 hp when tuned differently. The vehicle itself is composed primarily of reinforced carbon fiber, which lends to its relatively low curb weight. Lotec has also announced a re-designed version of the Sirius for 2009, that changes some of the body work but retains the same motor and transmission as the current model.

Car models 
Lotec 681, a Group 6 racing car Fitted with a BMW M88 I6, built in 1981.
Lotec M1C, a Group C racing car Fitted with a BMW M88 I6, built in 1982, and raced until 1985.
Lotec C302, a Group C racing car Fitted with a BMW M88 I6, built in 1985.
Lotec C302, a Group C racing car Fitted with a Ford-Cosworth DFL V8, built in 1985.
Lotec C190, a Group C racing car Fitted with a Mercedes-Benz M117 V8, built in 1990.
Lotec C1000, a one-off sports car built in 1995 Fitted with a Mercedes-Benz M117 V8.
Lotec 928 GT, a one-off sports car built in 1990 based on the Porsche 928.
Lotec Colani Testa D’Oro, a one-off sports car built in 1991 based on the Ferrari Testarossa.
Lotec TT 1000, a one-off sports car built in 1991.
Lotec Sirius, a sports car that has been produced since 2004.

See also 
List of German cars
 Isdera
 Sauber Motorsport

References

External links 
http://www.lotec-gmbh.de/ - Official Website
http://oppositelock.jalopnik.com/in-the-presence-of-greatness-1687568171/1687588211/+damon - C1000 last seen February 22, 2015 at Carolina Auto Sports in Concorn, NC

Sports car manufacturers
Car manufacturers of Germany
Automotive motorsports and performance companies
Car brands